Kibara may refer to:
 Kibara (plant), a genus of plants in the family Monimiaceae
 Kibara coriacea, a species of plant in the family Monimiaceae
 Kibara Mountains, a range in the Katanga Province of the Democratic Republic of the Congo
 Kibaran orogeny, a series of orogenic events in what is now Africa